"Disco Inferno" is a song by American rapper 50 Cent. It was released in December 2004 as the lead single from his second album, The Massacre. Although not as big as a global success as "In da Club", the lead single from his first album, Get Rich or Die Tryin', it was still a success in America, peaking at #3 on the Billboard Hot 100.

Background
Released in November 2004, the single debuted at #54 and peaked at #3 on the Billboard Hot 100 chart, becoming 50 Cent's fourth solo top-ten song on the chart and sixth overall. "Disco Inferno" was certified Gold by the RIAA. The song was produced by C. Styles & Bang Out. The song was also nominated for Best Rap Solo Performance at the Grammy Awards of 2006, but lost to Kanye West's "Gold Digger". This song is featured in DJ Hero.

Track listing
 12" vinyl
 "Disco Inferno" (Explicit) - 3:34
 "Disco Inferno" (Clean) - 3:34
 "Disco Inferno" (Instrumental) - 3:34
 "Disco Inferno" (Acapella) - 3:28
 CD single
 "Disco Inferno" (Explicit) - 3:34
 "Window Shopper" - 2:38
 "Best Friend" (featuring Olivia) - 4:08
 "Disco Inferno" (Ringtone) - 0:38

Charts

Weekly charts

Year-end charts

Certifications

References

2004 singles
50 Cent songs
2004 songs
Shady Records singles
Aftermath Entertainment singles
Interscope Records singles
Universal Music Group singles